Gorowa may refer to:
Gorowa people
Gorowa language